The Ogden-Fettie Site is a prehistoric mound site located south of Lewistown in Fulton County, Illinois. A village site is located near the principal mound; it and four of the smaller mounds form a pentagonal-shaped enclosure. While such enclosures were common among the Ohio Hopewell, the Ogden-Fettie Site has the only known one west of Ohio.

The site was added to the National Register of Historic Places on July 31, 1972.

References

Archaeological sites on the National Register of Historic Places in Illinois
National Register of Historic Places in Fulton County, Illinois
Mounds in Illinois
Havana Hopewell culture